The Lakehead District School Board (known as English-language Public District School Board No. 6A prior to 1999) oversees all secular English-language public schools in the Thunder Bay CMA and the townships of Gorham and Ware in Ontario, Canada.  It administers education at 22 elementary schools, 3 secondary schools and an adult education centre.

District Schools 

Elementary Schools
Algonquin Avenue Public School
Armstrong Public School
C.D. Howe Public School
Claude E. Garton Public School (French Immersion)
Crestview Public School (Murillo)
Ecole Gron Morgan Public School (French Immersion)
Ecole Elsie MacGill Public School (French Immersion
Five Mile Public School
Gorham and Ware Community School (Lappe)
Kakabeka Falls Public School (Kakabeka Falls)
Kingsway Park Public School 
McKellar Park Central Public School
McKenzie Public School (Shuniah) (K–6)
Nor'wester View Public School
Ogden Community Public School (K–7)
St. James Public School
Sherbrooke Public School
Valley Central Public School
Vance Chapman Public School
Westmount Public School
Whitefish Valley Public School (Whitefish Valley)
Woodcrest Public School
Public Secondary Schools
Hammarskjold High School (French Immersion)
Superior Collegiate and Vocational Institute (IB)
Westgate Collegiate & Vocational Institute (9–12)
Adult Education
Lakehead Adult Education Centre

Mascots 
Hammarskjold High School - Vikings
Superior Collegiate and Vocational Institute - Gryphons 
Westgate Collegiate & Vocational Institute - Tigers
Algonquin Avenue Public School - Gladiators
Armstrong Public School - Eagles
C.D. Howe Public School - Howlers 
Claude E. Garton Public School - Cougars
Crestview Public School - Yellowjackets
Ecole Gron Morgan Public School - Dragons
Ecole Elsie MacGill Public School - Hurricanes
Five Mile Public School - Falcons
Gorham and Ware Public School - Wolves
Kakabeka Falls Public School - Coyotes 
Kingsway Park Public School - Panthers
McKellar Park Central Public School - Thunderhawks
McKenzie Public School - Mustangs
Nor'wester View Public School - Knights
Ogden Community Public School - Otters
St. James Public School - Polar Bears
Sherbrooke Public School - Wildcats
Valley Central Public School - Cougars
Vance Chapman Public School - Vikings
Westmount Public School - Wolves
Whitefish Valley Public School - Eagles
Woodcrest Public School - Wildcats

Former Secondary Schools 
Fort William Collegiate Institute, 1907-2005
Port Arthur Collegiate Institute, 1910-2007
Selkirk Collegiate and Vocational Institute, 1931-1988 (St. Patrick High School as of 1988)
Lakeview High School, 1957-1990 (St. Ignatius High School as of 1990)
Hillcrest High School, 1928-2009
Sir Winston Churchill Collegiate & Vocational Institute, 1965-2018
Northwood High School, 1963-1996

See also 

Education in Thunder Bay, Ontario
Thunder Bay Catholic District School Board
Conseil scolaire de district catholique des Aurores boréales
List of school districts in Ontario
List of high schools in Ontario

References

External links
 Lakehead Public Schools

School districts in Ontario
Education in Thunder Bay